Zilverpijl (Flemish for 'Silver Arrow') is a Belgian comic book series set in the American Old West. The main character in the series is a Native American chief called , or Silver Arrow. The comic was created by Frank Sels and its artists include Edgard Gastmans and Karel Verschuere.

The title character of the series is the young Native American chief Silver Arrow,  a wise and resourceful chief of the Kiowa. Other main characters are his blood brother Falcon, and Silver Arrow's sister, Moonbeam. Her pet, the puma cub Tinka also has an important role. Falcon is Silver Arrow's blood brother, because he has saved his life. However, in Finnish,  became the Finnish-American .

The comic was very popular in Germany and the Nordic countries in the 1970s and 1980s.

The comic was published in Finland for ten years from 1976 to 1985. Issues 3 through 24 in 1979 and 1 through 7 in 1980 also featured Turok as a black-and-white supplement. The comic also included factual information about Native Americans and instructions for constructing Native American equipment. There was also a " Native American camp" at the Kullasvuori camping resort.

References

External links
 The author at Lambiek.net

Western (genre) comics
Drama comics
Belgian comics titles
1976 comics debuts
1985 comics endings
Comics characters introduced in 1976
Fictional Native American people
Belgian comic strips
Native Americans in popular culture
Male characters in comics